Patrick Criado de la Puerta (born 23 September 1995) is a Spanish actor. He became popular for his role in the TV series Águila Roja. He has also performed in series such as Mar de plástico, Unauthorized Living and Riot Police.

Biography 
Born on 23 September 1995 in Madrid, he was raised in the neighborhood of La Elipa. He had his debut in a television series in 2005, performing a guest role in Amar en tiempos revueltos. He performed the role of Lucas in the TV series , aired in 2006 on La 1.

Criado had his debut in a feature film in 2007, performing the role of Simón in Las 13 rosas. He was given a main cast role in the popular adventure series Águila Roja in 2009, playing the character of the smug and classist Nuño de Santillana, which earned Criado popularity at age 14.

Criado starred as Efraín in the 2013 film La gran familia española, directed by Daniel Sánchez Arévalo. His performance in the film earned him a nomination to the Goya Award for Best New Actor.

He joined the cast of Money Heist's Part 5 in 2020, playing Rafael, the son of Berlin.

Filmography 

Television

Film

Awards and nominations

References 

1995 births
Spanish male television actors
Spanish male film actors
21st-century Spanish male actors
Spanish male child actors
Male actors from Madrid
Living people